Sabine Sinjen (18 August 1942 – 18 May 1995) was a German film actress. She appeared in more than 50 films between 1957 and 1994. Sinjen was married to television director Peter Beauvais from 1963 to 1984.

She appeared as one of 28 women under the banner We've had abortions! (Wir haben abgetrieben!) on the cover page of the West German magazine Stern on 6 June 1971. In that issue, 374 women publicly stated that they had had pregnancies terminated, which at that time was illegal.

Selected filmography

 Precocious Youth (1957), as Hannelore
 Schmutziger Engel (1958), as Ruth
 Mädchen in Uniform (1958), as Ilse von Westhagen
 Stefanie (1958), as Stefanie Gonthar
 Marili (1959), as Marili
 Old Heidelberg (1959), as Käthi
 A Glass of Water (1960), as Abigail
 Stefanie in Rio (1960), as Stefanie Gonthar
  (1960), as Sabine Lorenz
 The Wild Duck (1961, TV film), as Hedvig Ekdal
 Napoleon II, the Eagle (1961), as Archduchess Sophie
 The Vinegar Tree (1961, TV film), as Leone
  (1961), as Thérèse
 The Forester's Daughter (1962), as Christel
 Alle meine Tiere (1962–1963, TV series, 9 episodes), as Bärbel Hofer
 Les Tontons flingueurs (1963), as Patricia
 The Pirates of the Mississippi (1963), as Evelyn
 It (1966), as Hilke
 Next Year, Same Time (1967), as Inge Deitert
  (1969, TV film), as Pauline
  (1970), Hella Meyer
 Tatort:  (1971, TV series episode), as Ulrike
 Der Kommissar:  (1971, TV series episode), as Sybille Laresser
  (1971, TV film), as Lizzie Shaw
  (1974, TV film), as Griseldis von Ronach
 Phantasten (1979, TV film), as Julia Sollier
  (1986), as Caroline Friedrich

References

External links

1942 births
1995 deaths
People from Itzehoe
German film actresses
German television actresses
Deaths from cancer in Germany
Best Actress German Film Award winners
20th-century German actresses